Mount Remington is a mountain (1,775 m) 4 nautical miles (7 km) northwest of Mount Bresnahan in the north part of Helliwell Hills. Mapped by United States Geological Survey (USGS) from surveys and U.S. Navy air photos, 1960–63. Named by Advisory Committee on Antarctic Names (US-ACAN) for Benjamin F. Remington, Jr., meteorologist who wintered over at Little America V, 1957, and at South Pole Station, 1959.

Mountains of Victoria Land
Pennell Coast